Ian Dexter Stannard (born 25 May 1987) is a British former professional track and road racing cyclist, who rode professionally between 2008 and 2020 for the ,  and  teams, before retiring after being diagnosed with rheumatoid arthritis. He now works as a directeur sportif for UCI WorldTeam , having previously held the same role for UCI Continental team .

Career

Early career
Born in Chelmsford, Stannard initially focused on the road and track, winning a gold medal in the time trial at the 2004 Commonwealth Youth Games, and a gold in the Under-23 Team Pursuit at the 2006 European Track Championships, alongside future Sky teammate Geraint Thomas. Stannard made his professional road debut in August 2007 joining  as a trainee. In 2009 he joined the new  team, and was selected to ride the Giro d'Italia, aged just 21. Stannard finished 160th at the Giro.

Team Sky (2010–2020)

2010
Stannard joined the new British Pro Tour team  for the start of the 2010 season, and focused more on the Classics and one day races. He took a third place in freezing conditions in Kuurne–Brussels–Kuurne.

2011
Stannard almost took victory in Gent–Wevelgem, after breaking away on the final climb, the Monteberg. The quartet kept clear of the chasing peloton until Stannard broke free of the break and crossed the flamme rouge alone. He obtained his first professional win at the Tour of Austria, winning stage 5 of the race, where he got the better of a group of five escapees in the sprint.

Stannard was part of the Great Britain team that helped Mark Cavendish win the road race at the UCI Road World Championships, with a vital pull in the closing stages to keep Cavendish towards the front of the peloton. One of the hardest working domestiques in the peloton, Stannard rode a total of  during 93 race days in 2011.

2012

In 2012, Stannard won the London Nocturne by lapping the field. He also won the British National Road Race Championships, winning ahead of Sky teammate Alex Dowsett. Stannard was selected to race on the British Olympic Road Race Team for 2012, alongside David Millar, Chris Froome, Bradley Wiggins and Mark Cavendish. The team aimed to lead Cavendish to a sprint victory on The Mall. Despite the best efforts of Stannard, Team GB were unable to pull back a large breakaway group on the run in to London, with the gold medal going to Alexander Vinokourov. Stannard again represented Britain at the UCI World Road Race Championships and was active in a breakaway with Andrew Talansky on the penultimate lap, eventually finishing in the main group.

2013

Stannard put in an impressive performance in freezing conditions at Milan–San Remo, initially riding on the front of the race in support of Geraint Thomas, then attacking with Sylvain Chavanel after Thomas crashed. Stannard led over the Poggio, only to be caught on the descent by a chase group of five riders. Stannard made a final move in the final two kilometres but was chased down by Peter Sagan, and he finished sixth in the sprint. Stannard was selected to ride the Tour de France for the first time in 2013, and played a key role as a domestique for Chris Froome, who went on to win the race overall.

2014
Stannard began 2014 in good form, finishing fourth overall in the Tour of Qatar in February. Stannard won Omloop Het Nieuwsblad  – the opening race of the Flanders Classics – after he out-sprinted his breakaway companion Greg Van Avermaet. In the process, Stannard became the first British rider to win the race. In Gent–Wevelgem, Stannard crashed heavily into a roadside ditch and was taken to hospital. He was diagnosed with fractured vertebrae, ruling him out of the rest of the classics season.

Stannard made his comeback to the road, riding for the English team in the men's road race event at the Commonwealth Games in Glasgow. A clearly uncomfortable Stannard withdrew early on in the race, which took place in treacherous rainy conditions – only 12 riders finished out of 140 starters – and which was eventually won by his Team Sky teammate Geraint Thomas. Stannard attempted another comeback, riding for Team Sky in the RideLondon–Surrey Classic. Stannard was noted for his hard work in successfully placing teammate Ben Swift in the eventually victorious breakaway group. Stannard was selected to ride the Tour of Britain, but broke his wrist in a crash on the first stage, putting an end to an injury plagued season.

2015

Stannard recovered from his injuries for the start of the 2015 season, again placing fourth in the Tour of Qatar. On 28 February, Stannard won Omloop Het Nieuwsblad, defending his 2014 title. He defeated Niki Terpstra in a two-man sprint, after spending the final  in a four-man group with a  triumvirate of Terpstra, Tom Boonen and Stijn Vandenbergh. He also fended off attacks by Boonen and Terpstra in the closing stages of the race.

2016

In an interview in January 2016 Stannard confirmed that he would not be competing in Omloop Het Nieuwsblad or Kuurne–Brussels–Kuurne in 2016, having previously appeared in the opening double header of the Belgian classics season in every year since 2010 and forgoing the opportunity to win the Omloop for the third year running, in order to focus on peaking for the Flemish Cycling Week. He also explained that his preparation for the spring classics would include debut appearances at the Volta ao Algarve and Paris–Nice. Stannard finished third at E3 Harelbeke, leading a small group across the line behind his victorious teammate Michał Kwiatkowski and Peter Sagan, who had broken away from the group earlier. He also finished on the podium at Paris–Roubaix, where he finished third in a sprint from a five-man group which had formed when Stannard animated the race with an attack on the cobbled section at Camphin-en-Pévèle. Stannard was part of the Tour de France-winning team, regarded as Sky's key domestique on flat stages.

Major results
Source:

2004
 1st  Time trial, Commonwealth Youth Games
 National Junior Road Championships
1st  Time trial
3rd Road race
 2nd Paris–Roubaix Juniors
2005
 1st  Points race, National Junior Track Championships
 1st  Overall Tour du Pays de Vaud
1st Stage 3 (ITT)
2006
 1st  Team pursuit, UEC European Track Championships
2007
 1st Clayton Velo Spring Classic
 1st Eddie Soens
 1st Milano-Busseto
 4th Overall Thüringen Rundfahrt der U23
2008
 3rd Overall Tour of Britain
2009
 1st Stage 1b (TTT) Settimana Internazionale di Coppi e Bartali
2010
 1st Stage 1 (TTT) Tour of Qatar
 3rd Road race, National Road Championships
 3rd Kuurne–Brussels–Kuurne
2011
 1st Stage 5 Tour of Austria
 4th Road race, National Road Championships
 4th Paris–Tours
2012
 1st  Road race, National Road Championships
 1st London Nocturne
2013
 2nd Road race, National Road Championships
 6th Milan–San Remo
 7th Overall Tour of Britain
 8th Overall Bayern Rundfahrt
 9th Dwars door Vlaanderen
2014
 1st Omloop Het Nieuwsblad
 4th Overall Tour of Qatar
2015
 1st Omloop Het Nieuwsblad
 1st Stage 1 (TTT) Tour de Romandie
 3rd Road race, National Road Championships
 4th Overall Tour of Qatar
2016
 1st Stage 3 Tour of Britain
 3rd E3 Harelbeke
 3rd Paris–Roubaix
2017
 1st Stage 4 Herald Sun Tour
2018
 1st Stage 7 Tour of Britain
2019
 2nd Road race, National Road Championships

Grand Tour general classification results timeline

Classics results timeline

References

External links

 
 
 Ian Stannard at Team Sky
 
 
 
 
 Ian Stannard  at Cycling Base

British male cyclists
English male cyclists
English track cyclists
1987 births
Living people
Commonwealth Games competitors for England
Cyclists at the 2006 Commonwealth Games
Cyclists at the 2012 Summer Olympics
Cyclists at the 2016 Summer Olympics
Olympic cyclists of Great Britain
Sportspeople from Chelmsford
British cycling road race champions
Cyclists at the 2014 Commonwealth Games